Spread the Net is a charitable organization that aims to reduce malaria in African nations. It was co-founded by Rick Mercer, a Canadian satirist, and Belinda Stronach, a former Canadian Member of Parliament and philanthropist.  A partnership with UNICEF Canada has allowed Spread the Net to achieve the goal of distributing 500,000 insecticide-treated bed nets to Liberia and Rwanda. Spread the Net now works with its partners to combat malaria. The campaign has donated over 539,000 nets since its founding.

History
In 2006, Rick Mercer and Belinda Stronach travelled to Africa along with Professor Jeffrey D. Sachs, director of the UN Millennium Project, in preparation to co-host the Millennium Promise Convention in Montreal on November 9, 2006. At the convention, Mercer and Stronach, along with Jeffrey Sachs and Nigel Fisher, President and CEO of UNICEF Canada, announced their intention to begin the Spread the Net campaign, and raise $5 million for insecticide treated bed nets to be given to children and pregnant women in Liberia and Rwanda. One X One founder Joey Adler and Millennium Promise Conference founder Daniel Germain each gave $150,000 to the campaign at the conference. The first order for 33,000 bed nets was made on March 28, 2007.

By December 2011, Spread the Net achieved its founding goal; 500,000 nets distributed to pregnant women and children in Liberia and Rwanda. Spread the Net has teamed with Plan Canada, working together to deliver another 250,000 nets, this time to Guinea.

In 2012, Spread the Net partnered together with the Mosquitoes Suck Tour, a 60-minute performance act for high school students across Canada.

Student Challenge
In 2007, Spread the Net started fund raising in Canadian Schools. Between 2007 and 2008 over 250 schools participated raising $300,000.  The competition has been presented to schools across Canada, and the school that raises the most to donate would be visited by Rick Mercer.  The challenge includes post-secondary, secondary, and elementary school divisions, and one wild-card winner.  In the 2010 edition, the challenge featured an additional twist by inviting schools in east to compete with their counterparts in the west, resulting in two post-secondary level winners.

Winners

See also
 Jeffrey Sachs
 Nothing But Nets
 Millennium Promise
 Malaria No More

References

External links
 Official site

Organizations based in Toronto
Malaria organizations
Organizations established in 2006
Health charities in Canada